Son Hyun-woo (born June 18, 1992), better known by his stage name Shownu, is a South Korean singer and dancer. He is the leader of the South Korean boy group Monsta X, which debuted under Starship Entertainment, through Mnet's survival show No.Mercy in 2015.

Career

Early life and pre-debut
Shownu was born in Chang-dong, Dobong-gu in Seoul, South Korea on June 18, 1992. 

Shownu was initially a trainee of JYP Entertainment, for around two years, after winning first place in the JYP auditions in 2009. He auditioned to JYP Entertainment as it is the label of the singer Rain, who inspired Shownu to become an idol. Although he gained praise at the company for his powerful dancing, he left the company citing "conflicts with the company" and "feeling of stagnation".

Shownu continued to participate in the idol industry, becoming a backup dancer for Lee Hyori and doing promotions with her, as well as appearing in her music videos for "Bad Girls" and "Going Crazy". He also appeared in the music videos, such as "Talk to My Face" by D-Unit and "Pitapat" by Bestie. 

After he auditioned and joined Starship Entertainment, he became part of the project Nu Boyz, alongside Monsta X members Jooheon and Wonho, as well as #Gun.

In December 2014, he competed in Mnet's survival reality show No.Mercy. He, alongside the other six contestants, then debuted in the hip-hop boy group Monsta X in 2015.

2015–2017: Debut in Monsta X and solo activities
Shownu debuted as the leader and main dancer of Monsta X, with the EP Trespass, on May 14, 2015.

Since debut, Shownu has made significant solo appearances on variety and reality shows, including being a regular cast member for two seasons of Lipstick Prince, which landed him a commercial film after winning the show, as well as appearing as a contestant on King of Mask Singer in 2018, as "Okey Donkey", while guesting for more than ten variety shows. Shownu has been praised for the diverse and unique types of entertainment he demonstrates in his appearances and his overall ability as an entertainer. He also appeared in Sistar's "Shake It" music video.

Along with being the main dancer of Monsta X, he also contributes to the group's choreography and has been praised for his skills by fellow choreographers. He has released his own choreography for songs, such as Ariana Grande's "Side to Side", Richard Parker's "Psychic", Charlie Puth's "LA Girls", Trevor Daniel's "Falling", and The Weeknd's "Heartless". Shownu also created the choreography for Bruno Mars's "Versace on the Floor" and Monsta X's "Mirror" that were performed at their world tours.

In June 2016, Shownu made his first solo appearance in a magazine for InStyle Korea.

2018–present: Solo appearances and endorsements
In January, he was selected to host the Korean-Japanese music show The Power of K, alongside Block B's U-Kwon and Momoland's Nancy, which was broadcast simultaneously in Korea and Japan.

On October 26, Shownu collaborated with the British band PREP's lead single "Don't Look Back", for their forthcoming album, alongside Hwang So-yoon of Se So Neon. Shownu had sought out PREP for collaboration as he was already a fan of the group. He also appeared in magazines with member Wonho for Nylon Korea in January, GQ Korea in August, and in October for Dazed Korea promoting Under Armour. Shownu also made a solo appearance in Taiwan magazine Bella in February.

In 2019, he again featured in a magazine alongside Wonho, for Elle Korea in August, where they were promoting Tom Ford's latest perfume line. He also featured on the cover of BEAUTY+ in October and again in November 2020.

Shownu is a credited writer on "Mirror" from Follow: Find You, and as a writer and composer on three of Monsta X's tracks from their sixth studio album All About Luv; including "Who Do U Love?" featuring French Montana, "Middle of the Night", and "Beside U" featuring Pitbull. Shownu also co-wrote "Someone's Someone" alongside the Before You Exit members.

In 2020, prior to the release of Monsta X's eighth EP Fantasia X, he injured his back, and the group delayed their comeback by two weeks to allow Shownu time to heal properly from his injury. Prior to the group's live-streamed concert "Live From Seoul with Luv", scheduled for July 25, he had to undergo emergency left eye retinal detachment surgery, and then the concert was postponed to August 8, to give Shownu the time to recover from surgery. He featured alongside Monsta X members in magazines several times in 2020, including appearing alongside Minhyuk and Joohoney for Harper's Bazaar Korea in May, Kihyun for W Korea in June, and with Joohoney for Esquire Korea in November.

In August, it was announced he would be featuring on the soundtrack for She's My Type, alongside group member Minhyuk, marking his first soundtrack appearance, independent of Monsta X, since 2011. The song is titled "Have a Goodnight", and was released on September 11. On October 15, Shownu released a rock-style song for the soundtrack of the Korean television drama Tale of the Nine Tailed, titled "I'll Be There".

In October, he had a solo feature in Dazed Korea for the Monsta X Dazed Project, GQ Korea to create a fashion film promoting Under Armour, while he appeared on the back cover of 1st Look Magazine Korea promoting Moschino Toy Boy perfume. Following the success of the promotion, he was selected as the first Korean muse for the Italian luxury fashion brand Moschino perfume.

In November, Shownu began appearing as a judge on Mnet's survival reality show Cap-Teen, making him the youngest judge on the show.

In March 2021, Shownu appeared in Elle Korea to promote Moschino Toy 2 Bubble Gum perfume. He also appeared in Dazed Korea promoting Brooks Sports shoe and clothing line. Shownu, along with Monsta X member Minhyuk, where chosen as the cover models for the first issue of Y Magazine Korea. Shownu was invited to the grand opening of the Dolce & Gabbana store in Seoul, Korea. It was also announced that Shownu would appear in the horror film Urban Myths.

On May 4, Starship announced that he would be taking a hiatus from Monsta X and would not promote for their upcoming comeback due to health problems related to his eye retinal detachment.

In July, Shownu and Minhyuk appeared in W Korea, promoting the premium luggage brand Rimowa. Furthermore, Shownu became the new face of lifestyle and cosmetics brand Round A'Round. Shownu with other Monsta X members' Hyungwon and I.M also joined Pepsi's Taste of Korea summer campaign, releasing a promotional single "Summer Taste" alongside Rain, Brave Girls members' Yujeong and Yuna, and Ateez members' Hongjoong and Yunho.

Personal life 
Shownu is a former swimmer for six years that swept the provincial championships. Currently, he is practicing veganism.

Shownu enlisted for his mandatory military service on July 22, 2021. He will serve as public service worker due to previous surgery for left eye retinal detachment.

Public image and impact
Shownu, as an individual and a member of Monsta X, is the "global trend" of the K-pop scene and has been continuously growing. Unlike the charisma shown on stage, Shownu is a member with opposite charms, with his original laid-back personality and reticent appearance. Through his physical and performance, he has solidified his presence by acquiring the modifier of "next-generation beast idol", having solid physicality and proportions. Shownu is an "all-round artist", who is not only a performer but also a vocalist. He also appeared on various entertainment programs and received a lot of love for his muscular body, charismatic appearance, and pure charm, showing his full potential as an artist.

Shownu placed first on YouTube and became the most popular idol, having 34.34% votes beside his strongest competitors, including BTS' Suga, Kim Jae-hwan, Exo's Kai, and Red Velvet's Joy. He has succeeded in establishing himself as a new character in the entertainment industry, boasting a wide spectrum of entertainment, while showing a different charm from his usual wild side on stage.

Shownu appeared on the cover of Cosmopolitan Korea for their 20th anniversary issue, which became sold out as soon as sales began. After the 1st Look Magazine Koreas release, Moschino perfume's Toy 2 sold out on Olive Young's online mall and also ranked first in perfume brand ranking, branding it as "Shownu's perfume".

Other ventures

Ambassadorship
In October 2020, as part of Monsta X's promotional campaign for Korea's traditional culture, Shownu participated in Hangeul Day's "Easy Korean, Correct Korean" campaign video, with Seo Kyung-duk, a famous Korean promoter who teaches at Sungshin Women's University. This four-minute video, produced by the Ministry of Culture, Sports and Tourism and the Federation of Korean Language and Culture Centers, was also created with an animation technique, under the theme of "COVID-19-related public language", that can be easily understood by anyone, regardless of age or gender.

Philanthropy
In April 2019, Shownu achieved a donation of ,276,000 through the Korean television program My Little Television V2, 1.6 times more than the original goal of ,000,000, with Kang Boo-ja, Kim Gu-ra, Jeong Hyeong-don, Kim Dong-hyun, and Kim Poong, wherein the donations they collected were used where each help was needed.

In June 2021, he donated 00,000 through the idol fandom community service My Favorite Idol, for his birthday. It will be delivered to the Miral Welfare Foundation and used as a fund for the disabled who are isolated due to COVID-19.

In June 2022, Shownu donated a total of ,000,000 through the idol fandom community service My Favorite Idol, on the occasion of his birthday on June 18. The donation will be delivered to the Miral Welfare Foundation and used as an emergency relief fund for Ukrainian refugees who are suffering from war.

Production
Shownu and I.M participated as readers of Edgar Allan Poe's Annabelle Lee and William Wordsworth's My Heart Leaps Up through Naver's audio-only platform Audio Clip, with the release of an interview video, a video of reading a book, audiobook recording site sketches, and a collection of NGs on Naver V Live Plus, also that they wanted to help the visually impaired people.

Discography

Singles

As featured artist

Promotional singles

Soundtrack appearances

Music videos

Filmography

Film

Television series

Reality/Variety shows

Music video appearances

Audiobook narrator

Awards and nominations

Notes

References

External links

 

1992 births
21st-century South Korean male singers
Living people
People from Seoul
Singers from Seoul
Starship Entertainment artists
Japanese-language singers of South Korea
English-language singers from South Korea
South Korean male idols
Monsta X members